919 Third Avenue is an office building in New York City, New York, USA, built in 1971, and is located at the intersection of Third Avenue and East 55th Street in Midtown Manhattan. The building was designed by Skidmore, Owings and Merrill.

History 
During the mid-1960s, in what the New York Times called "one of the most unusual Manhattan real estate transactions in recent years", developers of the new skyscraper decided to build around a Third Avenue establishment: P. J. Clarke's bar and restaurant. The property owner at the time refused to sell to the developers.

In December 1970, the fifth floor suffered a fire partially destroying part of the floor, injuring 20, and killing three. The building was completed in 1970, and tenant work was still in progress at the time of the fire. Use of the elevators resulted in the three fire deaths when the car inadvertently stopped at the fire floor. Others were almost killed in the same way but were rescued by fire fighters.

The City of New York created the most restrictive law of its kind for high-rise buildings. [Local Law # 5 of 1973], more than just steel and concrete as safety measures, adequate fire protection and a process to safely evacuate a high-rise building were introduced as a means to protect property and provide life safety for the occupants. The Local Law # 5 of 1973, called for Fire Safety Directors  to be on duty for each building over 100 feet in height or occupied with more than 100 people above or below the street or more than 500 people in total.

The building was occupied principally by carpet manufactures and carpet wholesalers and the fire started in occupancy of the type. The fire was confined for the most part to a specific area by the fire partitions required and the un-pierced horizontal separations. The fire did warp the exterior skin allowing a small amount of fire penetration to the floor above, but for the most part it was contained by the building structure. The fire, though contained, was very intense and did structural damage to the floor systems above. Total property damage to the building and its contents was estimated at $2.5 million. 
 
In July 1996, two repairmen almost died when a gust of wind smashed their scaffold through a window.

Tenants 
Notable occupants of 919 Third Avenue include Debevoise & Plimpton, Jenner & Block, Schulte Roth & Zabel, Bloomberg L.P. and Bloomingdale's.

The building was also the home of the New York offices of law firm Skadden, Arps, Slate, Meagher & Flom until 1999.

It is owned by SL Green Realty Corp.

See also
List of tallest buildings in New York City

References

External links
NYTIMES Sept. 9, 1967
Skyscraper Page

Office buildings completed in 1971
Skyscraper office buildings in Manhattan
Midtown Manhattan
Third Avenue
Skidmore, Owings & Merrill buildings